Naranjales may refer to:

Places
Naranjales, Las Marías, Puerto Rico, a barrio
Naranjales, Mayagüez, Puerto Rico, a barrio